Jasurbek Jumayev (born 12 December 1984) is a Turkmenistan male weightlifter, competing in the 94 kg category and representing Turkmenistan at international competitions. He competed at world championships, most recently at the 2014 World Weightlifting Championships.

Major results

See also
 2011 World Weightlifting Championships – Men's 94 kg

References

Further reading
 OlyStats.com
 Turkmentistan.gov.tm
 IWF.net Ranking List
 Olympic Weightlifting.eu 2014 World Weightlifting Men 94 kg
 
 

1984 births
Living people
Turkmenistan male weightlifters
Place of birth missing (living people)
Weightlifters at the 2010 Asian Games
Weightlifters at the 2014 Asian Games
Asian Games competitors for Turkmenistan
21st-century Turkmenistan people